The Wisconsin Badgers women’s basketball team is an NCAA Division I college basketball team competing in the Big Ten Conference. Home games are played at the Kohl Center, located on the University of Wisconsin–Madison campus in Madison, Wisconsin.  Previous to the Kohl Center, the home games were played at the Wisconsin Field House.

Coaching history

Marilyn Harris era (1974–1976)

Harris was the first coach of the women’s basketball team at UW. She led the Lady Badgers to a 16–20 record in two seasons.

Edwina Qualls era (1976–1986)

Qualls led the Badgers for 10 years and the start of the Big Ten Conference in 1982.  In the 1982–1983 season, the Badgers had recorded their best season thus far: 19–8. Qualls finished with a record of 131–141.

Mary Murphy era (1986–1994)

Murphy led the Badgers to an 87–135 record over eight years.  She was the Big Ten Conference Coach of the Year in 1992 with an overall record of 20–9 and a Big Ten record of 13–5.  In 1992, Murphy led the Badgers to their first appearance in the NCAA tournament.

Jane Albright era (1994–2003)

Albright led the Badgers for nine years and earned a record of 161–107. During her tenure, she led the Badgers to five NCAA tournament appearances, and two WNIT appearances.  The Badgers were WNIT runners-up in 1999 and WNIT champions in 2000.  Albright was the Big Ten Conference Coach of the Year in 1995.

Lisa Stone era (2003–2011)

Lisa Stone led the Badgers to a 128–118 (.520) record in eight seasons, with a Big Ten Conference record of 56–79 (.415).  The 2006–2007 season produced a record 23 wins (23–13) before the team fell in the WNIT championship to the University of Wyoming, 72–56.  The 2007–2008 season produced another trip to the WNIT, but the Badgers fell in the second round to Villanova University. The 2008–2009 season was the third consecutive year the Badgers went to the WNIT, making it to the third round before falling to St. Bonaventure.

The 2009–2010 season produced a 21–11 record as Stone took the Badgers to the NCAA tournament for the first time where they lost in the first round to Vermont, 64–55.
In Stone's final year (2010–2011) the Badgers finished 16–15, with another 10-win record in the Big Ten Conference (10–6) and another trip to the WNIT, where they bowed out in the second round to Illinois State 62–59.

Assistant coach was Tasha McDowell.

Bobbie Kelsey era (2011–2016)
On April 11, 2011 Bobbie Kelsey became the new head coach for the Badgers, signing a five-year contract. Her first season ended with a Big Ten tournament loss to Minnesota as the Badgers finished with a 9–20 overall record, finishing 5–11 in Big Ten play. Kelsey's second season ended with a 12–19 overall record, 3–13 in Big Ten play. The Badgers recorded their first Big Ten tournament win for Kelsey by beating Illinois 58–57 before bowing out of the tournament with a 74–62 loss to Purdue. The third season in the Kelsey era came to a close with a loss to Minnesota in the B1G tournament. The Badgers finished with an overall record of 10–19, with a 3–13 conference record. Taylor Wurtz and Morgan Paige became the 22nd and 23rd players to reach the 1,000 point plateau. At the end of the 2013–2014 Kelsey's contract was extended three years, ending in the spring of 2019. The 2014-15 season ended with an 11th-place finish in the conference and a 9-20 record. Kelsey's fifth year as head coach ended with a 7-22 overall record and a 13th-place finish in the conference. Kelsey was let go on March 4, 2016 after finishing with an all-time record of 47-100.

Jonathan Tsipis era (2016–2021)
On March 31, 2016, Jonathan Tsipis was named the head coach and first male coach of the Badgers women's basketball team. He previously was the head coach at George Washington University. He was relieved of his duties on March 9, 2021 following a 67-42 loss to Illinois in the first round of the Big Ten Women's Basketball Tournament. He finished with a 50-99 overall record in his 5 seasons.

Marisa Moseley era (2021–present)
Marisa Moseley was chosen as the new head coach on March 25, 2021.

Coaching staff
 Head Coach Marisa Moseley
 Associate Head Coach Scott Merritt
 Assistant Coach Kate Barnosky
 Assistant Coach Caroline Doty

Roster

2022 Recruiting Class

 Lily Krahn - Guard (5’9”) - Prairie du Chien, WI
 Tessa Towers - Center (6’4”) - Batavia, IL
 Savannah White - Guard (6’2”) - St. Paul, MN
 Serah Williams - Forward (6’4”) - Toronto, ON

Year by year results

Conference tournament winners noted with # Source

|-style="background: #ffffdd;"
| colspan="8" align="center" | Big Ten Conference

Postseason results

NCAA Division I

AIAW Division I
The Badgers made one appearance in the AIAW National Division I basketball tournament, with a combined record of 1–1.

All-time statistical leaders

Career points leaders (1,000 points or more)

Career rebounding leaders

Career assists leaders

Career steals leaders

Career blocks leaders

Badgers in the pros

References

Women's Basketball Historical Stats
Wisconsin's Season Ends in 60-54 WNIT Loss
Anderson Wins National Player of Year Award
WNBA Drafts Jolene Anderson
UW Women’s Basketball Team Names Annual Award Winners

External links